Ralf Sonn (born 17 January 1967 in Weinheim) is a retired German high jumper.

His personal best, achieved during the indoor season in March 1991 in Berlin, was 2.39 metres. Only five athletes (Sotomayor, Thränhardt, Sjöberg, Conway and Holm) have jumped higher on the indoor track. His outdoor PB was 2.34 metres, achieved at the World Championships in Stuttgart.

Competition record

External links

1967 births
Living people
German male high jumpers
Athletes (track and field) at the 1992 Summer Olympics
Olympic athletes of Germany
People from Weinheim
Sportspeople from Karlsruhe (region)